Anthonaeus is a genus of short-winged flower beetles in the family Kateretidae. There is one described species in Anthonaeus, A. agavensis.

References

Further reading

 
 

Kateretidae
Articles created by Qbugbot